Sribatcha Digal is  an Indian politician. He was elected to the Lok Sabha, the lower house of the Parliament of India as a member of the Janata Party.

References

External links
Official biographical sketch in Parliament of India website

1941 births
Lok Sabha members from Odisha
Janata Party politicians
Living people
India MPs 1977–1979